Big Creek Provincial Park is a provincial park in British Columbia, Canada.

It is adjoined on the south by the Spruce Lake Protected Area (a.k.a. the South Chilcotin or Southern Chilcotins, though in the Bridge River Country) and on the west by Tsʼilʔos Provincial Park.  Neighbouring on the east is the Churn Creek Protected Area.

The park was first established in 1995 and expanded in 2000, 2001 and 2004 to total approximately 67,918 hectares.

References 

Provincial parks of British Columbia
Geography of the Chilcotin
Chilcotin Ranges
1995 establishments in British Columbia
Protected areas established in 1995